Coucy-lès-Eppes station (French: Gare de Coucy-lès-Eppes) is a railway station located in the commune of Coucy-lès-Eppes, in the department of Aisne, northern France. It is situated at kilometric point (KP) 41.022  on the Reims-Laon railway. It is served by TER Grand Est trains between Reims and Laon (line C10) operated by the SNCF.

In 2018, the SNCF recorded 7,267 passenger movements through the station.

History 
On 31 August 1857, the Compagnie des chemins de fer des Ardennes commenced passenger operations on the 52km Reims-Laon railway, on which the station is situated. Freight services commenced a couple of months later on 15 October 1857.

The original station building was destroyed by combat during World War I and replaced at the culmination of the war.

See also 

 List of SNCF stations in Hauts-de-France

References 

Railway stations in Aisne
Railway stations in France opened in 1857